National Highway 367 commonly called NH 367 is a  National Highway in India.  It is a spur road of National Highway 67. NH-367 traverses the state of Karnataka in India.

Route 
Bhanpur - Kukunur - Yelburga - Gajendragad - Badami - Guledagudda - Bagalkot - Gaddankeri.

Junctions  
 
Terminal with National Highway 67 near Bhanpur.

Terminal with National Highway 52 near Gaddankeri.

See also 
 List of National Highways in India by highway number
 List of National Highways in India by state

References

External links 

 NH 367 on OpenStreetMap

National highways in India
National Highways in Karnataka